In molecular biology, Small nucleolar RNA snoR98 (also known as snoR98) is a non-coding RNA (ncRNA) which modifies other small nuclear RNAs (snRNAs). It is a member of the H/ACA class of small nucleolar RNA that guide the sites of modification of uridines to pseudouridines. Plant snoR98 was identified in a screen of Arabidopsis thaliana.

References

External links 
 

Small nuclear RNA